XHPAPA-FM is a noncommercial radio station on 90.3 FM in Papantla de Olarte, Veracruz. It is owned by El Aprendizaje Es Para Todos, A.C., and is part of the Radio Voces de Veracruz network of permit stations in northern Veracruz, operating as La Voz del Totonacapan.

History
XHPAPA was permitted on August 1, 2012.

References

External links
Radio Voces de Veracruz Facebook

Radio stations in Veracruz